Kenneth French Berry (October 10, 1916 – April 26, 2003) was a member of the Ohio General Assembly. He served the 19th District of the Ohio Senate in 1972. He lost the primary election, and thus served less than a year after being appointed.

Early life and military service
Berry attended Ohio Wesleyan University and University of Michigan Law School. Berry joined the United States Army on February 18, 1942. He was a veteran of World War II. Served over 4 years in the Armed Services including 42 months overseas. Served in Papaun, Bismarck Archipelago, New Guinea, Netherland East Indies and Philippine Campaigns. He achieved the rank of first lieutenant.

References

External links

1916 births
2003 deaths
Republican Party Ohio state senators
Ohio Wesleyan University alumni
People from Coshocton, Ohio
20th-century American politicians
United States Army personnel of World War II
University of Michigan Law School alumni
United States Army officers